Jonathan Lee Chung-shan (born 19 July 1958) is a Taiwanese musician and producer. He is regarded as one of the most influential and respected figures in the world of Mandopop music.

Life and career
Lee started in the music industry in the 1970s, during Taiwan's popular "campus folk song" era. He was a member of the "Wood Guitar" band. In 1983, Lee made his debut as a music producer for the album Light Rain Just Comes in Time by Zheng Yi, which became an instant hit. The self-titled single "Light Rain Just Comes in Time" ranked No. 1 for 13 consecutive weeks on Taiwan's main music chart; while the first single written, composed, and sang by Lee entitled "End", a duet in the album, also became a huge hit.

In 1984, Lee joined Rock Records, and has been credited with catapulting Rock Records into one of the foremost independent music labels in Asia. He helped pave the way for the golden era of Chinese pop music in the 1990s and 2000s, during which he wrote and produced many classic hits popular until today, setting impressive sales records, plus winning numerous accolades, such as Sarah Chen's "Dream to Awakening", Jackie Chan's "The Sincere Hero", Wakin Chau's "You Make Me Happy and Sad", Jeff Chang's "Love is Like Tidal Wave", Sandy Lam's "It Doesn't Matter Who I Am", Winnie Hsin's "Understanding", Karen Mok's "Overcast", and many more, which have all been hugely popular. As such, Lee has been hailed as the "million-dollar" producer, and deemed as the Godfather of Mandopop music, reaching and touching hundreds of millions of Chinese-speaking music fans around the world. He has been and remains one of the most successful and sought-after record producers in Chinese pop music scene. Given his iconic status in the Chinese music world, Lee's songs have influenced artists across Asia.

More than music production, Lee has also been involved in movie theme songs and OST projects, and having collaborated with many famous directors, including Hou Hsiao-hsien, Sylvia Chang, Jackie Chan, Chen Kaige, plus others.

In 2002, he founded his own guitar brand "Lee Guitars", and has been personally involved in the design and production of hand-made guitars ever since.

In 2009, Lee formed "Superband" with three other popular artists from Rock Records: Wakin Chau, Luo Dayou and Chang Chen-yue.

Lee also occasionally produces solo albums for himself and have recorded duets with many artists. His own songs "Jonathan's Song" in 2011 and "Hills" in 2013, both won "Song of the Year" and "Best Lyricist" awards at the 22nd and 25th Taiwan Golden Melody Awards respectively.

From 2013 to 2015, Lee embarked on his Even If Youth Is Never Lasting world tour, which kicked off in Taiwan, then toured on to China, Singapore, Malaysia, Australia, the U.S., and U.K., etc., covering dozens of cities around the world, including two consecutive performances at Lincoln Center in New York, a first for a Chinese-speaking musician. He also held a concert at the famed Royal Albert Hall in London, also a first for a musician from Taiwan.

Lee also served as Chief A&R Consultant for Sony Music in Greater China from 2013 to 2016. In addition, Lee was also a driving force in introducing the renowned Blue Note Jazz Club to Beijing, China. In September 2016, Lee was joined by famous American jazz pianist and composer Chick Corea, for the grand opening of Blue Note in Beijing. His hope is to introduce the great American jazz music and culture, plus the many great jazz musicians, to the Chinese-speaking world.

In September 2017, it was announced that the Tony-winning Signature Theatre in Arlington, Virginia, will help develop "Road to Heaven: The Jonathan Lee Musical", an original Chinese musical — in both Mandarin and English, based on music written by Lee. Adapted from the novel by Li Xiuwen, the original musical will feature music by Lee with English lyrics by Tony Award winner Richard Maltby Jr. (Ain't Misbehavin', Miss Saigon, Fosse) and a book by John Dempsey (The Pirate Queen, The Witches of Eastwick). The musical will then be translated back into Chinese for a world premiere in Shanghai in 2018. English-language productions are also planned for New York and other cities throughout the U.S. following the Chinese premiere.

Discography

Key productions

Discography

Film theme songs/score productions 
 1983 Growing Up
 1983 The Boys from Fengkuei
 1984 Ah Fei
 1987 Eastern Condors
 1987 Listen to Me
 1991 Sisters of the World Unite – nominated for Hong Kong Film Awards "Best Original Film Score”
 1992 Police Story 3: Super Cop
 1992 Three Summers
 1993 Farewell My Concubine
 1993 The East Is Red
 2014 Dream Flight

Television theme songs productions 
 1991 Farewell (TV drama) – theme song / TTV (Taiwan Television Enterprise) 
 1991 Eternal Love Like Ocean (碧海情天) (TV drama) theme and ending credit songs – "Ordinary Man" (凡人歌) and "Eternal Love Like Ocean"/TTV
 1992 The Last Emperor (TV drama) theme song – "Infatuation"/TTV
 1993 Young Heroes (TV drama) theme song – "Happy Like Gods"/TTV
 1993 Happy Building (TV drama) theme and ending credit songs/CTS (Chinese Television System) 
 1994 Chivalry Under the Blue Sky (TV drama) ending credit song/TTV
 1996 The New Longmen Roadhouse (TV drama) ending credit song/TTV

Songs for advertisements/commercials 
 1986 Little Cook Instant Noodles – Beef Flavor
 1987 Laurel Frozen Dumpling
 1989 Sprite and Coca-Cola
 1990 PECOS Soy Milk
 1991 FUJI COLOR Fuji Films
 1992 Yamaha Corporate Song
 1992 China Airlines
1992 Paolyta-B (energy drink)
 1993 HeySong Sarsaparilla Drink
 1993 BMW
 1993 Maxwell House Coffee
 1999 Suntory Whisky
 2016 Apple China – Send you a Spring Festival Song

Filmography

Film
 1983 Growing Up 
 1983 The Boys from Fengkuei 
 1984 Ah Fei 
 1985 My Favorite Season 
 1986 The Lock of Hearts 
 1987 Listen to Me 
 1988 Friendly Shock (Yaya)

Television
 1985 What/TTV 
 1990 Sunday Fever – Apocalypse (variety show)/TTV

Concerts
 2006–2009 Sense and Sensibility World Tour (11 Shows)
 2009–2010 Superband World Tour (58 Shows)

Radio programs
 "Talking Past Each Other" – Host / Taiwan PBS (Police Broadcasting Service) – nominated for Taiwan's Golden Bell Awards for "Popular Music Radio Program" and "Best Radio DJ”
 "Appointment After Dusk" – Host / PBS 
 "Musician" – Host / i like radio (Broadcasting Corporation of China) – won Golden Bell Awards Best Radio DJ Award

Awards and nominations

References

External links

Lyrics of songs composed by Lee 

1958 births
Living people
20th-century Taiwanese  male singers
21st-century Taiwanese male  singers
Musicians from Taipei
Taiwanese Mandopop singer-songwriters
Taiwanese record producers
Superband (band) members